WIYE may refer to:

 WIYE-LD, a television station (channel 26) licensed to Parkersburg, West Virginia, United States
 WACX,  a television station (channel 55) licensed to Leesburg, Florida, United States, which formerly used the WIYE call sign